The AAPC, previously known by the full title of the American Academy of Professional Coders, is a professional association for people working in specific areas of administration within healthcare businesses in the United States. AAPC is one of a number of providers who offer services such as certification and training to medical coders, medical billers, auditors, compliance managers, and practice managers in the United States. , AAPC has over 190,000 worldwide members, of which nearly 155,000 are certified.

History
The AAPC was founded in 1988, as the American Academy of Professional Coders, with the aim of providing education and certification to coders working in physician-based settings. These settings include group practices and specialty centers (i.e. non-hospital settings). In 2010, as their services had expanded beyond medical and outpatient coding, the full name was dropped in favor of the AAPC initialism.

Products and services
AAPC provides training, certification, and other services to individuals and organizations across medical coding, medical billing, auditing, compliance, and practice management. These services include networking events such as medical coding seminars and conferences.

Certifications
AAPC offers a number of certifications for healthcare professionals, including:
 Medical coding and medical billing, including stand-alone certifications in over 20 specialty areas,
 Medical auditing
 Medical compliance
 Physician practice management

See also
Health informatics
Information governance
Medical classification

External links
 AAPC official site

References 

Organizations established in 1988
Medical associations based in the United States
Health informatics and eHealth associations
Coding schools
Companies based in Salt Lake City
Medical and health organizations based in Utah